The islands of Japan are primarily the result of several large ocean movements occurring over hundreds of millions of years from the mid-Silurian to the Pleistocene, as a result of the subduction of the Philippine Sea Plate beneath the continental Amurian Plate and Okinawa Plate to the south, and subduction of the Pacific Plate under the Okhotsk Plate to the north.

Japan was originally attached to the eastern coast of the Eurasian continent. The subducting plates, being deeper than the Eurasian plate, pulled Japan eastward, opening the Sea of Japan around 15 million years ago. The Strait of Tartary and the Korea Strait opened much later.

Japan is situated in a volcanic zone on the Pacific Ring of Fire. Frequent low intensity earth tremors and occasional volcanic activity are felt throughout the islands. Destructive earthquakes, often resulting in tsunamis, occur several times per century. The most recent major quakes include the 2011 Tōhoku earthquake and tsunami, the 2004 Chūetsu earthquake and the Great Hanshin earthquake of 1995.

Geological history

Orogeny phase

The breakup of Rodinia about 750 million years ago formed the Panthalassa ocean, with rocks that eventually became Japan sitting on its eastern margin. In the Early Silurian (450 million years ago), the subduction of the oceanic plates started, and this process continues to the present day, forming a roughly 400 km wide orogeny at the convergent boundary. Several (9 or 10) oceanic plates were completely subducted and their remains have formed paired metamorphic belts. The most recent complete subduction of a plate was that of the Izanagi Plate 95 million years ago. Currently the Philippine Sea Plate is subducting beneath the continental Amurian Plate and the Okinawa Plate to the south at a speed of 4 cm/year, forming the Nankai Trough and the Ryukyu Trench. The Pacific Plate is subducting under the Okhotsk Plate to the north at a speed of 10 cm/year. The early stages of subduction-accretion have recycled the continental crust margin several times, leaving the majority of the modern Japanese archipelago composed of rocks formed in the Permian period or later.

Island arc phase
Around 23 million years ago, western Japan was a coastal region of the Eurasia continent. The subducting plates, being deeper than the Eurasian plate, pulled parts of Japan which become modern Chūgoku region and Kyushu eastward, opening the Sea of Japan (simultaneously with the Sea of Okhotsk) around 15-20 million years ago, with likely freshwater lake state before the sea has rushed in. Around 16 million years ago, in the Miocene period, a peninsula attached to the eastern coast of the Eurasian continent was well formed. About 11 million years before present, the parts of Japan which become modern Tōhoku and Hokkaido were gradually uplifted from the seafloor, and terranes of Chūbu region were gradually accreted from the colliding island chains. The Strait of Tartary and the Korea Strait opened much later, about 2 million years ago. At the same time, a severe subduction of Fossa Magna graben have formed the Kantō Plain.

Current state

General information
Overall, the geological composition of Japan is poorly understood. The Japanese islands are formed of several geological units parallel to the subduction front. The parts of islands facing oceanic plates are typically younger and display a larger proportion of volcanic products, while the parts facing the Sea of Japan are mostly heavily faulted and folded sedimentary deposits. In north-west Japan, the thick quaternary deposits make determination of the geological history especially difficult.

Geological structure
The Japanese islands are divided into three major geological domains:
Idosawa Fault
Senya Fault
Hidaka Mountains
Kitakami Mountains
Ōu Mountains
 Central Japan, between Tanakura fault and Itoigawa-Shizuoka Tectonic Line.
Fossa Magna graben
Tanna Fault
Bōsō Hill Range
 Southwestern Japan, south of Itoigawa-Shizuoka Tectonic Line. The Southwestern Japan is further subdivided into several metamorphic belts stretched along Japan Median Tectonic Line. The parts of Japan north of Japan Median Tectonic Line ("Inner Zone") contains many granitoid fragments dating from Paleogene to Cretaceous period intruding the older material, while south of the line ("Outer Zone") is mostly accretionary complexes of Jurassic period or younger.
Urasoko fault
Fukozu Fault
Neodani Fault
Nojima Fault
Hida orogenic belt (Hida Mountains and Ryōhaku Mountains)
Sangun orogenic belt
Maizuru orogenic belt
Tanba-mino orogenic belt
Ryoke orogenic belt
Shimanto orogenic belt
Sambagawa orogenic belt
Chichibu orogenic belt
Sambosan orogenic belt
Beppu–Shimabara graben

Research
  - since 1893
  - since 1968
  - since 1998

Geological hazards
Japan is in a volcanic zone on the Pacific Ring of Fire. Frequent low intensity earth tremors and occasional volcanic activity are felt throughout the islands. Destructive earthquakes, often resulting in tsunamis, occur several times a century. The most recent major quakes include the 2011 Tōhoku earthquake and tsunami, the 2004 Chūetsu earthquake and the Great Hanshin earthquake of 1995.

See also 
Geography of Japan
Seismicity in Japan
List of earthquakes in Japan
List of volcanoes in Japan
List of mines in Japan

References

Further reading

by - (Author),

External links

Geological Survey of Japan - English homepage
Geological Journal of Japan - English homepage

 National Archives of Japan:  Tatoroyama no ki, survey of limestone cave in Mount Tatoro in Kozuke Province, 1837 (Tenpo 8).